Village of Belle Terre v. Boraas, 416 U.S. 1 (1974), is a United States Supreme Court case in which the Court upheld the constitutionality of a residential zoning ordinance that limited the number of unrelated individuals who may inhabit a dwelling.

Background
A zoning ordinance in the Village of Belle Terre, New York restricted one-family dwellings to single family, which was defined as "[o]ne or more persons related by blood, adoption, or marriage, living and cooking together as a single housekeeping unit" or two people unrelated by blood or marriage.

The appellees leased a house zoned for single-family residential to a group of students at nearby State University at Stony Brook. The Village of Belle Terre then brought an order of eviction, claiming that the students did not constitute a family and so were excluded from that zoned area.

Prior history
The appellees sought declaratory judgment and an injunction declaring the ordinance unconstitutional. The district court held the ordinance constitutional, and the Court of Appeals for the Second Circuit reversed.

Arguments/theories
The students and homeowner argued that (1) the ordinance interferes with a person's right to travel; (2) it interferes with the right to migrate to and settle within a state; (3) it bars people who are uncongenial to the present residents; (4) it expressed social preferences of the residents for groups that will be congenial to them; (5) social homogeneity is not a legitimate interest of government; (6) the restriction of those whom the neighbors do not like trenches on the newcomers' right to privacy; (7) it is not rightful concern to the villages whether the residents are married or unmarried; (8) the ordinance is antithetical to the egalitarian, open, and integrated ideology of the nation.

Decision
The Supreme Court held that the Belle Terre ordinance was a constitutional restriction on the use of land. It further held that the police power is a valid basis for establishing residential zones limiting the number of unrelated individuals that may inhabit a dwelling. In particular, the majority opinion cited the Palo Alto Tenants Union v. Morgan, a 1973 federal decision upholding density limits in zoning.

The Supreme Court held

 Because there was no protected class discrimination, and no fundamental right infringed by the ordinance, the proper standard of review was the rational basis test.  
 The  legislature should define a family, rather than the judiciary.  As long as there exists a rational basis for the legislature's determination, it would be upheld by the courts.   
 The ordinance did not restrict the freedom of association, as homeowners may entertain whomever it wants and that the ordinance was only a restriction on who could permanently live in that residence.  
 The city had a rational basis for its prohibition on housing large numbers of unrelated individuals because creating a quiet neighborhood is a permissible state goal and this ordinance is closely related enough to this goal to be sustained under the rational basis test.

Dissenting opinions
 Justice Marshall dissented, arguing that
 The ordinance infringes the fundamental rights of association and privacy and thus the proper standard of review is strict scrutiny.
 Zoning officials may restrict the use of land, but may not properly restrict who the persons living on land may be, "what they believe, or how they choose to live."  
The right to establish a home is an essential part of liberty protected by the due process clause. The choice of companions is essential to this right. 
The city's attempt to maintain a residential character cannot justify this particular ordinance, because it allows any number of residents, as long as they are related.  Thus, this ordinance was under inclusive. 
 The ordinance is not narrowly tailored to the ends sought and was thus over inclusive.  For example, “It would...prevent three unrelated people from occupying a dwelling even if...they had...one income and no vehicles.”

Justice Marshall went on to say
 "It is inconceivable to me that we would allow the exercise of the zoning power [established in a 1926 U.S. Supreme Court ruling, Euclid v. Ambler Realty] to burden First Amendment freedoms, as by ordinances that restrict occupancy to individuals adhering to particular religious, political, or scientific beliefs.  Zoning officials properly concern themselves with the uses of land—with, for example, the number and kind of dwellings.  But zoning authorities cannot validly consider who those persons are, what they believe, or how they choose to live, whether they are Negro or white, Catholic or Jew, Republican or Democrat, married or unmarried."

See also
Moore v. East Cleveland,

References

External links

United States Supreme Court cases
United States land use case law
United States substantive due process case law
United States equal protection case law
1974 in United States case law
Stony Brook University
United States Supreme Court cases of the Burger Court